Areti is a village of the Lagkadas municipality. Before the 2011 local government reform it was part of the municipality of Vertiskos. The 2011 census recorded 186 inhabitants in the village. Areti is a part of the community of Lofiskos.

See also
 List of settlements in the Thessaloniki regional unit

References

Populated places in Thessaloniki (regional unit)